

Commercial Hotel, also known as the General Pershing Hotel, was a historic hotel and theater complex located in DuBois, Pennsylvania, United States.  The four story brick structure opened as a two-story hotel with 58 rooms in 1889. It was enlarged to four stories and 100 rooms with an expansion in 1901.  The 700 seat Harris-DuBois Theater, later the DuBois Playhouse, opened in 1937.  The building has been demolished.

It was listed on the National Register of Historic Places on November 13, 1985.

See also
 Contributing property
 Cultural landscape
 Historic preservation
 Keeper of the Register
 List of heritage registers
 Property type (National Register of Historic Places)
 United States National Register of Historic Places listings
 State Historic Preservation Office

References

External links
Cinema Treasures | DuBois Theatre

See also 
 National Register of Historic Places listings in Clearfield County, Pennsylvania

Hotel buildings on the National Register of Historic Places in Pennsylvania
Hotels in Pennsylvania
Theatres in Pennsylvania
Buildings and structures in Clearfield County, Pennsylvania
National Register of Historic Places in Clearfield County, Pennsylvania